Katerina Izmailova' may refer to 
Lady Macbeth of the Mtsensk District (opera), opera by Dmitri Shostakovich, retitled for revised version in 1962
Katerina Izmailova (film), a 1966 Soviet film adaptation of Lady Macbeth of the Mtsensk District
Katerina Izmailova (swimmer) (born 1977), Tajikistani swimmer